Eduard Hauser (born 26 November 1948) is a former Swiss cross-country skier who competed in the early 1970s.  He won a bronze in the 4 x 10 km cross-country skiing relay at the 1972 Winter Olympics in Sapporo. He also competed at the 1976 Winter Olympics and the 1980 Winter Olympics.

References

External links 
 Max Bardone Fan Club on the 1972 4 x 10km bronze (Switzerland) 

1948 births
Living people
Cross-country skiers at the 1972 Winter Olympics
Cross-country skiers at the 1976 Winter Olympics
Cross-country skiers at the 1980 Winter Olympics
Olympic medalists in cross-country skiing
Swiss male cross-country skiers
Medalists at the 1972 Winter Olympics
Olympic bronze medalists for Switzerland
Olympic cross-country skiers of Switzerland
20th-century Swiss people